The 2021 RS:X European Championships were held from 7 to 13 March 2021 in Vilamoura, Portugal.

Medal summary

References

European championships in sailing
RS:X European Championships
2021 in Portuguese sport
International sports competitions hosted by Portugal
Sailing in Portugal
RS:X